World's End Harem is a Japanese manga series written by LINK and illustrated by Kotaro Shōno. The manga began its serialization on Shueisha's online magazine Shōnen Jump+ on May 8, 2016. In May 2020, it was announced that the first part of the manga reached its climax. The first part of the manga finished with its 85th chapter on June 21, 2020. In March 2021, it was announced that the second part of the manga, titled World's End Harem: After World, would start to be published on Shōnen Jump+ on May 9 of that year. Shueisha has collected its chapters into individual tankōbon volumes. The first volume was published on September 2, 2016. As of September 2, 2022, sixteen volumes have been released. In October 2017, Seven Seas Entertainment announced the acquisition of the manga for an English language release under its Ghost Ship imprint for mature readers.


Volume list

World's End Harem (first part)

World's End Harem: After World (second part)

Chapters not yet in tankōbon format 
These chapters have yet to be published in a tankōbon volume.

References

External links 
  

Lists of manga volumes and chapters